Willy Arne Björkman (born 4 August 1946) is a Swedish television personality mostly known for his participation in the home improvement show Bygglov on TV4. He participated as a celebrity dancer in Let's Dance  where he placed third along with professional dancer Charlotte Sinclair.

References

External links 

Living people
1946 births